Buffeljagsriver (Afrikaans for "buffalo hunt") is a river that originates where two other rivers meet, one being the Grootvadersbos River (Afrikaans for Grandfather's woods) and the other the Tradou River. The confluence is just east of a small town, Suurbraak, Western Cape province. The Tredouw's Pass is situated just north (in the Langeberg) of this meeting point. To the west of the town the river flows into the Buffeljags Dam, and the river then heads south to join the Breede River (also known as the Breë River), not far from the Bontebok National Park.

The Buffeljagsrivier the area 
Buffeljagsrivier, not to be confused with Tweebuffelsmeteenskootmorsdoodgeskietfontein, is also the name of the small farming community located in the area.

The Buffeljagsriver area is rich in historical value. Its name originates from the late 1800s when Governor Hendrick Swellengrebel's (from whom Swellendam got its name) son visited the area. It is said that he shot the last buffalo that roamed the area.

Today, Buffeljagsriver is a thriving farming community with a wide variety of crops and animals being farmed. Some of the tourism destination farms in the area today include Rotterdam, the lavender farm, and Olivedale Vineyards.

The area is a fertile region producing vegetables, citrus, milk and cheese, lavender and peppers. The Buffeljagsdam, located at the foot of the Langeberg mountains, provides water all year round for the farms below it.

Activities offered at Bufflejagsdam  include fuffy-slide rides, bass fishing, canoeing, water-skiing and sunset cruises. The area offers various conference and team building facilities.

Points of interest 

 Bontebok National Park
 Buffeljags dam

Businesses in the area

Accommodation and Recreation 

 Kwetu Guest Farm
 Rotterdam Boutique Hotel
 Umshanti Buffeljags
 Laeveld

Retail 

 Infanta 4x4 Trailers
 Rolandale Farmstall
 Milk and Sugar
 Buffeljacht's Winkel
 Buffeljacht's Drankwinkel
 BP (refueling station)

Industry and Farming 

 Lancewood
 Thornlands Group
 Swellenfruit Packing

See also 
 Olivedale, Buffeljagsriver
 List of rivers of South Africa
 List of reservoirs and dams in South Africa
 List of drainage basins of South Africa
 Water Management Areas

References

Rivers of the Western Cape